Birkenhead is a suburb of Auckland, in northern New Zealand. It is located on the North Shore of the Waitemata Harbour, four kilometres northwest of the Auckland CBD.

In November 2010, the suburb was included into the North Shore ward, one of the thirteen administrative divisions of the newly-formed Auckland Council. Under the council, Birkenhead is part of the Kaipatiki Local Board Area.

It is surrounded by the suburbs of Northcote to the east, Glenfield to the north and Birkdale, Chelsea and Chatswood to the west. The southern part of the suburb is known as Birkenhead Point and lies on a promontory between Chelsea Bay and Little Shoal Bay, one kilometre to the west of the northern approaches to the Auckland Harbour Bridge.

The shopping area is known as the Birkenhead Town Centre with the term Highbury being used for the older shopping centre at the junction of Birkenhead Avenue and Mokoia Road.

History
Birkenhead was originally known as Woodside, but was registered as Birkenhead in on 23 June 1863 by Samuel Broker because it reminded him of the English town of Birkenhead which is across from the city of Liverpool, separated by the River Mersey, just as Birkenhead is separated from Auckland by the Waitematā Harbour.

Birkenhead was described as "wild and bleak" by The New Zealand Herald in 1883, as it was isolated from the city of Auckland by the harbour, and was little occupied. However, in 1882 it was chosen as the site of New Zealand's only sugar refinery, and in 1883 work began on what was later known as the Chelsea Sugar Refinery. The company built houses for its many new workers and thus the suburb of Birkenhead began. The Refinery was the main source of work for the area for many years; in 1910 a third of the adult men who lived in Birkenhead worked at the sugar refinery. In 1883 a farm estate called "Mayfield" was auctioned and subsequently subdivided for housing sections.

Once the site of ancient kauri forests, Birkenhead was the site of temporary gum-diggers' camps: as men and women sought to dig up the lucrative fossilized resin.  Auckland families would cross the Waitemata Harbour by ferry at weekends to dig in the fields around Birkenhead, causing damage to public roads and private farms, and leading to local council management of the problem.

Birkenhead was one of several areas on the North Shore popular as a location for the homes of successful middle-class people. These men, usually professionals or business owners, would use the Auckland Harbour Ferry Services to commute to Auckland. The wharves at Devonport, Northcote and Birkenhead were very busy until the construction of the Auckland Harbour Bridge in 1959 changed things forever. The ferry to Birkenhead was resumed in the 1980s and since the increase in congestion on the bridge, the usage of the Birkenhead Ferry has grown considerably.

Local government 

From 1876 until 1888, Birkenhead was a part of the Takapuna Riding administered by the Waitemata County, a large rural county north and west of the city of Auckland. In 1888, the area split from the council, forming the Birkenhead Borough Council alongside the surrounding suburbs. In 1978, the borough council became the Birkenhead City Council, and in 1989, was merged into the North Shore City. North Shore City Council was amalgamated into Auckland Council in November 2010.

Within the Auckland Council, Birkenhead is a part of the Kaipātiki local government area governed by the Kaipātiki Local Board. It is a part of the North Shore ward, which elects two councillors to the Auckland Council.

Mayors during Birkenhead Borough Council 

Source:

Mayors during Birkenhead City Council 

Source:

Demographics

Birkenhead had a population of 10,536 at the 2018 New Zealand census, an increase of 894 people (9.3%) since the 2013 census, and an increase of 1,230 people (13.2%) since the 2006 census. There were 3,780 households, comprising 5,022 males and 5,514 females, giving a sex ratio of 0.91 males per female, with 1,836 people (17.4%) aged under 15 years, 2,037 (19.3%) aged 15 to 29, 5,010 (47.6%) aged 30 to 64, and 1,653 (15.7%) aged 65 or older.

Ethnicities were 75.7% European/Pākehā, 6.7% Māori, 2.9% Pacific peoples, 20.0% Asian, and 3.9% other ethnicities. People may identify with more than one ethnicity.

The percentage of people born overseas was 39.0, compared with 27.1% nationally.

Although some people chose not to answer the census's question about religious affiliation, 53.4% had no religion, 33.6% were Christian, 0.2% had Māori religious beliefs, 1.8% were Hindu, 1.2% were Muslim, 1.9% were Buddhist and 2.2% had other religions.

Of those at least 15 years old, 3,495 (40.2%) people had a bachelor's or higher degree, and 753 (8.7%) people had no formal qualifications. 2,487 people (28.6%) earned over $70,000 compared to 17.2% nationally. The employment status of those at least 15 was that 4,755 (54.7%) people were employed full-time, 1,281 (14.7%) were part-time, and 216 (2.5%) were unemployed.

Economy

Highbury Shopping Centre
Highbury Shopping Centre is located in Birkenhead. It includes 600 carparks and 25 retailers, including a Countdown supermarket.

Sport

Birkenhead is home to Birkenhead United who compete in the Lotto Sport Italia NRFL Division 1B.

Education
Birkenhead School was founded in 1919 as an extension of Northcote School. Verran Primary School was founded in 1964. Rolls are as of

Notable people
Clement Lindley Wragge, the meteorologist who began the tradition of using people's names for cyclones lived his final years at 8 Awanui Street, Birkenhead and planted palms in his, and neighbours', gardens.
Rudall Hayward was an early NZ film-maker, producing Rewi's Last Stand (see Cinema of New Zealand)
Hone Tuwhare, the poet, was briefly a Birkenhead Borough Councillor
Hon Mike Rann CNZM, former Premier of South Australia, Australian High Commissioner to UK and Ambassador to Italy, lived in Birkenhead from 1964 to 1977.
Edward Le Roy was a businessman who ran a tent making business in Auckland. Le Roys Bush and Le Roy Tce are named after him.

See also
 Birkenhead Public Library
 Chelsea Sugar Refinery
 Le Roys Bush, Auckland

References

The Heart of Colonial Auckland, 1865–1910. Terence Hodgson. Random Century NZ Ltd 1992.
The Story of Birkenhead. Margaret McClure. Birkenhead City Council 1987. 223 pages.

External links
 Birkenhead School website
 Verran Primary School website
 Birkenhead Community  Facilities Trust
 Photographs of Birkenhead held in Auckland Libraries' heritage collections.

Suburbs of Auckland
North Shore, New Zealand
Kaipātiki Local Board Area